Ala-Kitka is a medium-sized lake in the Koutajoki main catchment area. It is located in Kuusamo, Northern Ostrobothnia in Finland. It is connected with a bigger lake Yli-Kitka with a Raappanansalmi strait. They can be calculated together in the name of Kitkajärvi.

See also
List of lakes in Finland

References

Lakes of Kuusamo